The Ministry of Regional Development (abbreviated MDR) was a cabinet-level federal ministry in Brazil, established in 2019 by the fusion of the Ministry of Integration and Regional Development and the Ministry of Cities. It was dissolved on January 1, 2023 and both of the ministries were recreated.  

The MDR was particularly tasked with reducing regional inequality, housing, emergency management, water resources, urban mobility and development, integration and development of the regions of Brazil.

References

External links
 Official site

Regional Development
Brazil, Regional Development